Trischalis aureoplagiata is a moth in the family Erebidae. It was described by Walter Rothschild in 1913. It is found in New Guinea.

References

Moths described in 2007
Nudariina